The Government College of Engineering and Ceramic Technology, formerly known as College of Ceramic Technology (CCT), is a public college affiliated to the Maulana Abul Kalam Azad University of Technology in Kolkata, India. The college offers B.Tech in Ceramic Technology, Information Technology and Computer Science and Engineering and M.Tech in the first two. The college has recently stepped into its 75th year of existence. The Platinum Jubilee of the college was celebrated in April 2016 with association of international conferences, an alumni meet and visit of eminent peoples.

Graduation
The college offers B.Tech in Ceramic Technology, Information Technology and Computer Science and Engineering. There is an intake capacity of 48 students (40 through WBJEE and 8 through JELET respectively) per department. The B.Tech courses of the CSE and IT departments were introduced in 2001 and 2000 respectively. First convocation of GCECT was held on 26 August 2017 at College premises.

Achievements
 NAAC accredited grade A autonomous institution under Maulana Abul Kalam Azad University of Technology.
 The college is an IBM Software Centre of Excellence
 Joint research project with IIT-Kharagpur- the development of jute reinforced concrete
 Joint industrial project with TISCO- Comparative study of wear mechanism of MgO –Carbon, Al2O3-MgO-Carbon and Pitch bonded Dolomite Refractories in Steel Ladle Working Environment

Festivals

KarmaTek (formerly Techtronics) and Jagriti are the technical and cultural festivals respectively, that the college students conduct annually.

References

External links
 

Colleges affiliated to West Bengal University of Technology
Engineering colleges in Kolkata
1941 establishments in India
Educational institutions established in 1941